The RPG-18 Mukha is a Soviet short-range, disposable light anti-tank rocket launcher designed in 1972.

History

The RPG-18 is very similar to the US M72-series LAW anti-tank rocket launcher. The RPG-18 has been succeeded by the RPG-22, a very similar design with a larger warhead.

Description
The RPG-18 fires a 64 mm PG-18 high-explosive anti-tank (HEAT) warhead mounted on a small rocket able to engage targets within 200 meters. The warhead self-destructs six seconds after launch, placing a limit on range even if a sight was used that was effective with targets beyond 200 meters. The RPG-18 can penetrate up to 375 mm of conventional armor. However, performance is significantly lessened when the RPG-18 is used against targets protected by HEAT-resistant explosive reactive armour (ERA) or composite armor.

Unlike better known weapons, the RPG-18 requires only one operator because it is not reloadable.  Assistant grenadiers are used to help reload the RPG-2, RPG-7 and RPG-16 systems.

Users

 
 
 
 
 
 
 
 
  Hamas
  Iraqi insurgents
 
 
 
 
 
 
 
  Free Syrian Army

Former users
  Chechen Republic of Ichkeria
  Democratic Forces for the Liberation of Rwanda
 Farabundo Marti National Liberation Front (FMLN)
 
 : Sandinista Popular Army

See also
 RPG-76
 M80 Zolja

References

General
 Jones, Richard. Jane's Infantry Weapons 2005–06. Coulsdon: Jane's, 2005.  .

External links

 RPG-18 
 Modern Firearms
 Military-Today
 Weapon Systems
 Military Factory

Cold War anti-tank rockets of the Soviet Union
Modern anti-tank rockets of Russia
Military equipment introduced in the 1970s